JGSP Novi Sad (full legal name: Javno Gradsko Saobraćajno Preduzeće Novi Sad) is a public transit company for the city of Novi Sad.

History
The company was founded on 3 August 1946 by order of the city, although the first modern tram line in Novi Sad was opened on 30 September 1911.

Buses
As of January 2016, JGSP Novi Sad has 259 buses in its fleet operating in urban and suburban lines, with the average bus age of 13.5 years.

According to the list of registered buses for the calendar year of 2015, JGSP Novi Sad has the following bus brands in its fleet: Volvo, Ikarbus, Solaris, Irisbus and Neobus.

Lines

As of January 2018, there are twenty-three urban lines and thirty-four suburban lines, operated by 640 bus drivers.

Urban Lines
1  Liman I - Center - Klisa
2  Center - Novo Naselje
3  Petrovaradin - Center - Detelinara
3A Railway station - Pobeda
4  Liman IV - Center - Railway station
5  Temerin Road - Center - Avijatičarsko naselje
5N Railway station - Najlon Market - Temerin Road
6  Podbara - Center - Adice
7A Novo Naselje - Railway station - Liman IV - Novo Naselje 
7B Novo Naselje - Liman IV - Railway station - Novo Naselje 
8  Liman I - Center - Novo Naselje
9  Novo Naselje - Liman - Petrovaradin
9A Novo Naselje - Liman - Petrovaradin (Alibegovac)
10 Center - Industrial Zone South
11A Railway station - Hospital - Liman IV - Railway station
11B Railway station - Liman IV - Hospital - Railway station
12 Center - Telep
13 Detelinara - Grbavica - University
14 Center - Sajlovo
15 Center - Industrial Zone North
16 Railway station - Harbor zone
17 Center - BIG shopping center
18a Novo Naselje - Detelinara - Center - Liman - Novo Naselje
18b Novo Naselje - Liman - Center - Detelinara - Novo Naselje
20 Railway station - "Lesnina"
21 Railway station - Šangaj
25 Railway station - North work zone IV
68 Railway station - Vojinovo
69 Railway station - Sremska Kamenica (Čardak)
71 Railway station - Sremska Kamenica (Bocke)

Suburban Lines
Terminus near railway station:
22 Kać
23 Budisava
24 Kovilj
30 Pejićevi salaši
35 Čenej
41 Rumenka
42 Kisač
43 Stepanovićevo
52 Veternik
53 Old Futog
54 Futog - Grmečka street
55 Futog - Braće Bošnjak street
56 Begeč
64 Bukovac
72 Paragovo
73 Mošina Vila
74 Popovica
76 Stari Ledinci

Terminus on the main bus station:
31 Bački Jarak
32 Temerin
33 Gospođinci
60 Sremski Karlovci (Belilo II)
61 Sremski Karlovci (Vinogradarska street)
62 Sremski Karlovci (Dudara)
77 Stari Rakovac
78 Beočin Selo
79 Čerević
80 Beočin (bus station)
81 Banoštor
84 Lug

References

External links

 Official website

Transport companies established in 1946
1946 establishments in Yugoslavia
Transport companies of Serbia
Bus companies of Serbia
Companies based in Novi Sad
Public transport in Serbia
Bus transport in Serbia
Transport in Vojvodina
Transport in Novi Sad